Wahkiacus is an unincorporated community in Klickitat County, Washington, United States. Wahkiacus has a post office with ZIP code 98670.

References

Unincorporated communities in Klickitat County, Washington
Unincorporated communities in Washington (state)